Kovai Brothers is a 2006 Tamil-language comedy spoof film written, produced, and directed by Sakthi Chidambaram. The film stars Sathyaraj, Sibiraj, Vadivelu, Namitha, Uma and Kovai Sarala. The music was composed by D. Imman. The film was dubbed in Telugu as Pokiri Brothers.

Plot
Kovai Brothers tells of Ganesh and Vasanth, who are friends who come to Chennai to take revenge on the killers of Ganesh's niece. The duo stays with Ekadasi and then works in a TV channel that exposes corruption in the society. Sanya also works as an anchor in the same channel. Ganesh and Vasanth both see Sanaya and fall for her. Ganesh and Vasanth take on the bad guys and corruption besides falling for the same girl. The rest of the film is on how they kill the rowdies and who wins Sanya's love.

Cast

Sathyaraj as Ganesh
Sibiraj as Vasanth
Vadivelu as Ekadasi
Namitha as Sania
Uma as Ganesh's niece and Vasanth's girlfriend
Kovai Sarala as Tenthara, Foursha and Bisin
Shobha as Leelavathy, Ekadasi's wife
Arun Pandian as Doctor
T. P. Gajendran as Doctor
Thambi Ramaiah as Astrologer
Vennira Aadai Moorthy as Ekadasi's Father-in-law
Delhi Ganesh
Sriman
Singamuthu
Halwa Vasu
D. Imman (cameo appearance in song "Ulagathula")

Critical reception
Sify wrote: "The film lacks logic or sense and rests purely on Satyaraj’s ‘lollu’ dialogues and his takes on Suriya’s Ghajini, S. J. Surya’s New, Simbu’s Manmathan and also pokes fun at stars joining politics". Thiraipadam wrote:"Completely illogical, unfunny and boring".

Soundtrack

References

2006 films
2000s Tamil-language films
Indian action films
Indian vigilante films
Films scored by D. Imman
2006 action films
2000s vigilante films
Films directed by Sakthi Chidambaram